Sergey Boychenko (born 27 September 1977) is a Kazakhstan football coach and a former goalkeeper. He works as a goalkeeping coach with Aktobe.

Club career
He started his career at FC Spartak Semey.

External links

1977 births
Living people
Kazakhstani footballers
Kazakhstan international footballers
Kazakhstan Premier League players
FC Aktobe players
FC Zhenis Astana players
FC Ordabasy players
FC Vostok players
FC Kairat players
FC Atyrau players
FC Spartak Semey players
Association football goalkeepers